Rushmere may refer to:

Places
Rushmere, Bedfordshire, a location in England
Rushmere, Hampshire, a location in England
Rushmere, Ipswich, part of Ipswich, Suffolk, England
Rushmere Ward, Ipswich
Rushmere, north Suffolk, a village near Lowestoft, Suffolk, England
Rushmere St Andrew, a village and civil parish near Ipswich in Suffolk, England
Rushmere, Virginia, a village in the United States
Rushmere Country Park

People
Colin Rushmere, South African cricketer and conservationist
John Rushmere, South African architect, cricketer and rugby union player (brother of Colin)
Mark Rushmere, South African cricketer (son of Colin)

See also
Rushmore (disambiguation)